Eda Municipality (Eda kommun) is a municipality in Värmland County in west central Sweden, on the Norwegian border. Its seat is located in the town of Charlottenberg.

The municipal reform of 1971 saw the forming of the present municipality through the amalgamation of "old" Eda with Köla and Järnskog.

Localities
Charlottenberg (seat)
Eda glasbruk
Koppom
Åmotfors (partly)

Government and politics
Distribution of the 35 seats in the municipal council after the 2010 election:
Social Democratic Party   11
Centre Party   10
Hela Edas Lista   8
Moderate Party   4
Christian Democrats   1
Liberal People's Party   1

Results of the 2010 Swedish general election in Eda:
Social Democratic Party   43.0%
Moderate Party   22.7%
Centre Party   12.3%
Sweden Democrats   5.7%
Left Party   4.6%
Christian Democrats   4.0%
Liberal People's Party   3.7%
Green Party   2.8%

Sights
The Eda Fortlet (Eda skans), which was in use from 1650 to 1814, was the largest fortress in the province of Värmland. Its purpose was to defend against Norwegian troops. It was made obsolete with the Union between Sweden and Norway in 1814. A museum opened on the site in 1996.

References

External links

Eda Municipality - Official site

Municipalities of Värmland County